CBS Workshop, aka CBS Repertoire Workshop is an hour-long dramatic television anthology series that was produced by and aired on CBS mid-day on Sundays in the 1960s.  There were a total of twenty-five episodes with guest stars that included Maureen Stapleton, Raul Davila, Ossie Davis, Larry Hagman, Fritz Weaver, and Andrew Prine. Collaborators from the realm of opera included the conductor Alfredo Antonini and the soprano Martina Arroyo  
 Contributors from the world of modern American dance included Alwin Nikolais, Murray Louis and Ruth Page

Among its writers were Lewis John Carlino and Robert Herridge.

References

External links

CBS Workshop at CVTA

1960s American anthology television series
1960 American television series debuts
1960 American television series endings
CBS original programming